Canada Business Network (CBN) is a collaborative arrangement among Canadian federal government departments and agencies, provincial and territorial governments, and not-for-profit entities1. Its aim is to provide small and medium Canadian businesses and enterprising organizations with the resources they need to grow and prosper in a global economy, free of charge.

Management and Governance

Governance of the CBN is outlined in a combination of inter-jurisdictional agreements and collaborative arrangements defining roles and responsibilities at the federal and regional level.

Federally, CBN is managed in the following configuration:

Innovation, Science and Economic Development (ISED)
 National Office

Atlantic Canada Opportunities Agency
 New Brunswick
 Nova Scotia
 Newfoundland and Labrador
 Prince Edward Island

Canada Economic Development for Quebec Regions
 Quebec

Canadian Northern Economic Development Agency
 Northwest Territories
 Nunavut
 Yukon

Federal Economic Development Agency for Southern Ontario
 Ontario

Prairies Economic Development Canada
 Alberta
 Manitoba
 Saskatchewan

Pacific Economic Development Canada
 British Columbia

Services

CBN promotes entrepreneurship and innovation, and aims to reduce the complexity for entrepreneurs in dealing with multiple levels of government. On the Network's website  entrepreneurs can learn how to register a business and get information on planning and managing their operations including doing market research and protecting their intellectual property. Business owners can also search for government financing programs as well as federal, provincial/territorial, and municipal permits and licences.

Connect with the CBN  through a toll-free phone number: 1-888-576-4444 or TTY: 1-800-457-8466, and receive support from regional service centres.

Services available to businesses and enterprising non-profits include (but are not limited to) seminars, business education, networking events, business advisory services, and business research services by geographic location and business sector.

Social Media Engagement

CBN uses social media as an extension of its presence on the Web. In addition to weekly blogs on a variety of business topics, CBN has a presence on Twitter , Facebook , and YouTube .

Media Mentions

CBN has been mentioned in the following Canadian newspaper and magazine articles:

 10 Best Websites for Small-Business Owners, Connected for Business magazine, June 2013
 Den Dragons offer business advice, Metro News, November 2012
 'Walking the talk' and going green pays off for Oxfam, The Globe and Mail, March 2012

Notes

 Departmental Performance Report for the period ending March 31, 2013, Industry Canada

External links
 CanadaBusiness.gc.ca

Innovation, Science and Economic Development Canada
Business organizations based in Canada